The Synod of Rome (721) (also known as the Council of Rome of 721) was a synod held in St. Peter’s Basilica under the authority of Pope Gregory II to establish canons to improve church discipline.

Background
On April 5, 721, Pope Gregory II opened a synod to deal with tightening up the rules of matrimony, and a number of minor offenses committed against the Church. Present along with the Pope were nineteen Italian bishops, and three non-Italian bishops: Sindered of Toledo, Sedulius from Britain, and Fergustus Pictus from Scotland. Also present were a number of Roman priests and deacons.

The seventeen canons of the synod
The synod drew up seventeen canons to improve church discipline. These included a prohibition on marrying:
 1. The widow of a priest;
 2. Or a Deaconess;
 3. Or a nun;
 4. Or his spiritual Commater;
 5. The wife of his brother;
 6. Or his niece;
 7. His stepmother or daughter-in-law;
 8. His first cousin;
 9. Or a relation, or the wife of a relation.

It further placed anathemas on:
 10. A man marrying a widow;
 11. A man who ravishes a virgin to whom he was not betrothed, in order to take her as his wife, even if she were to consent;
 12. If a man is guilty of superstitious usages;
 13. Anyone who violates the earlier commands of the Apostolic Church in regard to the olive-yards belonging to it.

It mentioned specific anathemas against:
 14. Hadrian, who married the deaconess Epiphania;
 15. As well as Epiphania herself;
 16. And whoever helped her to marry.

Finally, the synod also anathematized:
 17. Any cleric who lets his hair grow.

The synod finished its deliberations on the same day it started.

References
 Hefele, Charles Joseph; Clark, William R. (trans.), A History of the Councils of the Church from the Original Documents, Vol. V (1896)
 Mann, Horace K., The Lives of the Popes in the Early Middle Ages, Vol. I: The Popes Under the Lombard Rule, Part 2, 657-795 (1903)

Notes

Rome,721
History of the papacy
721
Medieval Rome